This is a list of music-related events in 1973.



Specific locations
1973 in British music
1973 in Norwegian music

Specific genres
1973 in country music
1973 in heavy metal music
1973 in jazz

Events

January–April
January 8 – British Rail authorities restrict Pipe Major Gordon Speirs to playing his bagpipes just one minute in every fifteen on Liverpool Street station, London, on grounds that his playing (part of a holiday campaign by the Scottish Tourist Board) "interferes with station business".
January 9 – Mick Jagger's request for a Japanese visa is rejected on account of a 1969 drug conviction, putting an abrupt end to The Rolling Stones' plans to perform in Japan during their forthcoming tour.
January 14
Elvis Presley's Aloha From Hawaii Via Satellite television special is broadcast in over 40 countries around the world.
Grateful Dead bassist Phil Lesh is arrested for drug possession at his Marin County home.
January 18 – The Rolling Stones' benefit concert for Nicaraguan earthquake victims raises over $350,000. On December 22, 1972, an earthquake destroyed Managua, the capital of Nicaragua.
January 21 – The Rolling Stones open their Pacific tour of Hawaii, Australia and New Zealand in Honolulu, Hawaii.
January 30 – Kiss perform their first concert, at the Coventry Club in Queens, New York City, United States.
February 2 – The Midnight Special makes its début as a regular series on US TV channel NBC. Helen Reddy is the featured artist.
February 14 – David Bowie collapses from exhaustion after a performance at New York's Madison Square Garden.
February 18 – The King Biscuit Flower Hour is first broadcast with performances by Blood, Sweat & Tears, The Mahavishnu Orchestra, and new artist Bruce Springsteen.
March 1
Leonard Bernstein conducts Pyotr Ilyich Tchaikovsky's Violin Concerto for the first time in his career, with soloist Isaac Stern and the New York Philharmonic Orchestra.
The Joffrey Ballet's Deuce Coupe Ballet opens. The ballet is set entirely to music by The Beach Boys.
Pink Floyd releases The Dark Side of the Moon, which goes on to become one of the best-selling albums of all time.  The album debuts on the Billboard 200 on March 17, reaches #1 on April 28, and eventually logs the all-time record of 741 weeks on that chart.
March 5 – Jimi Hendrix's former personal manager, Michael Jeffery, is killed in a plane crash. Jeffery was travelling from Majorca to England. All passengers on board the plane were killed.
March 6 – The New York Office of the US Immigration Department cancels John Lennon's visa extension five days after granting it.
March 7 – The director of talent acquisition at Columbia Records, John H. Hammond, suffers a non-fatal heart attack following a performance by one of his most recent finds, Bruce Springsteen.
March 8 – Paul McCartney is fined $240 after pleading guilty to charges of growing marijuana outside his Scottish farm.
March 14 – The singers Stephen Stills and Véronique Sanson are married near Guildford, England.
March 24 – Lou Reed is bitten on the buttocks by a fan during a concert in Buffalo, New York.
April 2 – Capitol Records releases two collections of The Beatles' greatest hits, The Beatles 1962-1966 and The Beatles 1967-1970 (commonly referred to as the "Red Album" and the "Blue Album", respectively).
April 7 – In Luxembourg, the 18th Eurovision Song Contest is won by Luxembourg for the second consecutive year, this time with "Tu te reconnaîtras", sung by Anne-Marie David.  Spain finish in second place with "Eres Tú", sung by Mocedades; the United Kingdom finish third with Cliff Richard singing "Power to All Our Friends". The top three placed songs become international hits.
April 8 – Opening of the first La Rochelle Festival of Contemporary Music, under the direction of Claude Samuel. Featured composers include Karlheinz Stockhausen and Iannis Xenakis
April 15 – Tenth Royan Festival of International Contemporary Art begins, including concerts featuring music by  Jean Barraqué and Horațiu Rădulescu, amongst others.
April 16 – Paul McCartney's first solo television special, James Paul McCartney, airs on ABC. The special includes performances by McCartney and Wings.
April 18 – Violinist Jascha Heifetz deposits parts from his prized Guarnerius violin in the newly poured wet concrete of the foundation for the new Virginia Ramo Hall of Music, under construction at the University of Southern California, United States, in order to ensure the building will be "in tune", and to bring luck.

May–August
May 4 – July 29 – Led Zeppelin embarks on a tour of the United States, during which they set the record for highest attendance for a concert, 56,800, at the Tampa Stadium in Tampa, Florida.  The record was previously held by The Beatles. Performances for the movie The Song Remains the Same are also filmed.
May 9 – Mick Jagger adds $150,000 of his own money to the $350,000 raised by The Rolling Stones' January 18 benefit concert for the victims of the Nicaraguan earthquake.
May 12 – David Bowie is the first rock artist to perform at Earls Court Exhibition Centre.
May 13 – Daniel Barenboim collapses with a gastric upset during a concert at the Brighton Festival, but later had sufficiently recovered to be driven home.
May 23 – Don Robey sells Duke Records, Peacock Records and Backbeat Records to ABC Dunhill Records.
May 25 – Mike Oldfield's Tubular Bells becomes the first release on Richard Branson's newly launched Virgin label.
June 4 – Ronnie Lane plays his last show with Faces at the Edmonton Sundown in London. Lane had informed the band three weeks earlier that he was quitting.
June 15 – The first Istanbul International Music Festival opens.
June 16 – Benjamin Britten's opera Death in Venice, receives its première at Snape Maltings.
June 29 – The Scorpions play their first gig with Uli Roth at a festival in Vechta. Roth was originally intended as a temporary replacement for Michael Schenker, who had just been snapped up by U.F.O. earlier in the month.
June 30 – Ian Gillan quits Deep Purple.
July 1 – Slade play a sell-out Earls Court in London after two number one singles this year.
July 3 – David Bowie 'retires' his stage persona Ziggy Stardust in front of a shocked audience at the Hammersmith Odeon at the end of his British tour.
July 4 – Slade drummer Don Powell is critically injured in a car crash in Wolverhampton; his 20-year-old girlfriend is killed.  With his life in danger, the band's future is left in the balance. Powell recovered after surgery, and was able to join the band ten weeks later in New York, to record "Merry Xmas Everybody".
July 13 – The Everly Brothers break up after Phil Everly smashes his guitar on the floor midway through their final show together. Queen releases their debut album.
July 15 – Ray Davies of The Kinks makes an emotional outburst during a performance at White City Stadium, announcing he is quitting the group. He later recants the statement.
July 28 – Summer Jam at Watkins Glen rock festival is attended by 600,000, who see The Allman Brothers Band, The Band, and the Grateful Dead.
July 30 – Soviet officials grant permission for Gennadi Rozhdestvensky to accept a three-year appointment as chief conductor of the Stockholm Philharmonic Orchestra, the first time a Soviet orchestra conductor has been allowed to take up such a position outside of the Eastern Bloc.
August 6 – Stevie Wonder is seriously injured in a car accident outside Durham, North Carolina, spending the next four days in a coma.
August 11 – DJ Kool Herc originates the hip hop genre in New York City.
August 20 – The London Symphony Orchestra becomes the first British orchestra to take part in the Salzburg Festival.
August 25 – The Allman Brothers nearly suffer another tragedy when Butch Trucks crashes his car near Macon, Georgia, not far from where Duane Allman was killed two years earlier. Trucks survives with only a broken leg.

September–December
September 1 – The Rolling Stones open their European tour in Vienna, Austria.
September 20 – Jim Croce, Maury Muehleisen and four others die in a plane crash in Louisiana.
September 22 – Benita Valente makes her debut with the Metropolitan Opera, singing Pamina in The Magic Flute.
September 23 – The Roxy Theatre opens in West Hollywood, California.
September 27 – Don Kirshner's Rock Concert is premièred on syndicated television in the United States, including a performance by The Rolling Stones.
September 29 – Jan Akkerman from the Netherlands was chosen 'Best Guitarist in The World' by the readers of the UK magazine, Melody Maker. 
October 6 – Brighouse and Rastrick Brass Band become the national brass-band champions of Great Britain by defeating 18 other bands at the Albert Hall in London.
October 12 – Genesis releases their 5th studio album Selling England by the Pound, one of their most commercially successful albums
October 13 – Family play their last concert at De Montfort Hall at Leicester Polytechnic (now De Montfort University) before splitting up for good. A farewell party at a local Holiday Inn after the show ends in a good-natured melée, with people jumping in or pushed into the motel pool.
October 17 – The 1973 oil crisis begins, causing shortages of the vinyl needed to manufacture records. A number of new albums are either delayed or only available in limited quantities until after the holiday season.
October 19 – The Who release Quadrophenia, one of their most critically acclaimed albums.
October 20 – Queen Elizabeth opens Sydney Opera House.
November 1 – Kiss becomes the first act signed to Neil Bogart's new label, Casablanca Records.
November 5
Cellist Jacqueline du Pré is forced to retire because she has been diagnosed with multiple sclerosis.
Two friends of the recently deceased Gram Parsons hand themselves in to police and confess to having carried out an impromptu cremation of the singer's body at the Joshua Tree National Monument.
November 7 – Harold Holt Ltd., agent for Jacqueline du Pré, deny newspaper reports that she will never perform again, while at the same time confirming she has been diagnosed with "a mild case of multiple sclerosis" and has no definite plans for future performances.
November 20 – The Who open their Quadrophenia US tour with a concert at San Francisco's Cow Palace, but drummer Keith Moon passes out and has to be carried off the stage. 19-year old fan Scot Halpin is selected from the audience to finish the show.
December – Paul Pena produces his second album, New Train, but due to a dispute with Albert Grossman of Bearsville Records the release was canceled. The album would later be released on Hybrid Recordings in 2000.
December 3 – CBGB music club opens in Manhattan.
December 15 – Jermaine Jackson marries Hazel Gordy, daughter of Motown Records executive Berry Gordy.
December 25 – Universal Pictures releases The Sting, reviving interest in the ragtime music of Scott Joplin.
December 31
Brothers Malcolm and Angus Young perform under the name AC/DC at the former Sydney nightclub 'Chequers' for their New Year's Eve party.
The second annual New Year's Rockin' Eve airs on NBC, with performances by Tower of Power, Billy Preston and The Pointer Sisters.

Unknown dates
 Musica Antiqua Köln formed.
 Royal Manchester College of Music and the Northern School of Music merge to create the Royal Northern College of Music.
 The Santa Fe Chamber Music Festival is launched, with Pablo Casals as its president.
 U.F.O. signs a contract with Chrysalis Records.
 Approximate date – Salsa music originates in New York City.

Bands formed
 See Musical groups established in 1973

Bands disbanded
 See Musical groups disestablished in 1973

Albums released

January

February

March

April

May

June

July

August

September

October

November

December

Release date unknown

 8th Street Nites - Back Door
 953 West - Siegel-Schwall Band
 Abbiamo tutti un blues da piangere – Perigeo
 Afrodisiac – Fela Kuti
 Afrodisiac - The Main Ingredient
 After the Ball - John Fahey
 Air Cut - Curved Air
 The Alchemist - Home
 All I Need Is Time - Gladys Knight & the Pips
 And I Love You So – Perry Como
 Andy Pratt - Andy Pratt
 Anthenagin - Art Blakey
 Aquashow – Elliott Murphy
 Arbeit macht frei – Area
 Astral Traveling - Lonnie Liston Smith
 Attempted Mustache – Loudon Wainwright III
 Back Street Crawler - Paul Kossoff
 Back to the World – Curtis Mayfield
 Bad Dreams - Ike Turner 
 Baron von Tollbooth & the Chrome Nun - Paul Kantner, Grace Slick, and David Freiberg
 Basic Miles: The Classic Performances of Miles Davis – Miles Davis
 Be What You Are - The Staple Singers
 Beans and Fatback - Link Wray
 Behind Closed Doors – Charlie Rich
 Betty Davis – Betty Davis
 Black & Blue - Harold Melvin & the Blue Notes
 Black Byrd - Donald Byrd
 Both Feet on the Ground - Kenny Burrell
 Bummm! – Locomotiv GT
 Bursting at the Seams - Strawbs
 Butterfly Dreams - Flora Purim
 Call of the Wild - The Amboy Dukes
 Can't Get No Grindin' - Muddy Waters 
 Canto por travesura – Víctor Jara
 Cannons in the Rain - John Stewart
 Carnegie Hall - Hubert Laws
 Chameleon in the Shadow of the Night - Peter Hammill
 The Chieftains 4 – The Chieftains
 Chemins de Terre – Alan Stivell
 Le Cimetière des arlequins – Ange
 Come into My Life - Jermaine Jackson
 Composite Truth - Mandrill
 Concerto delle menti – Pholas Dactylus
 Conference of the Birds – Dave Holland
 Cosmic Cowboy Souvenir - Michael Martin Murphey
 Crystal Silence - Chick Corea and Gary Burton
 Dave Mason Is Alive - Dave Mason
 Doing It to Death - The J.B.'s
 Don't Mess with Mister T. - Stanley Turrentine
 Double Diamond – If
 Dublin Street Songs / Through Dublin City – Frank Harte
 Duncan Browne - Duncan Browne
 Earth – Vangelis
 Etta James - Etta James
 Evolution - Malo
 Extensions - McCoy Tyner
 Farewell to Paradise – Emitt Rhodes
 The Faust Tapes – Faust
 Felona e Sorona – Le Orme
 For Real! – Ruben and the Jets
 Forever and Ever – Demis Roussos
 Funky Kingston - Toots and the Maytals
 Funky Serenity - Ramsey Lewis
 Gentleman - Fela Kuti
 Giant Box - Don Sebesky
 Gluggo - The Spencer Davis Group
 Grimms – Grimms
 Hank Wilson's Back Vol. I - Leon Russell
 Home Thoughts – Clifford T. Ward
 How Sweet to Be an Idiot – Neil Innes
 Have a Good Time for Me – Jonathan Edwards
 Hymn of the Seventh Galaxy - Return to Forever
 I'm in Love with You – The Detroit Emeralds
 Inside – Eloy 
 Join Inn – Ash Ra Tempel
 Jonathan Livingston Seagull – Neil Diamond
 Journey - Kingdom Come
 Joy - Issac Hayes
 Julien – Dalida
 Just Outside of Town - Mandrill
 Kindling - Gene Parsons
 Kings of Oblivion - Pink Fairies
 Layers - Les McCann
 Lifemask – Roy Harper
 Light as a Feather – Return to Forever 
 Live at the Lighthouse – Elvin Jones – Live
 Live in Japan: Spring Tour 1973 – Donovan

 The London Bo Diddley Sessions - Bo Diddley
 Long Hard Climb - Helen Reddy
 Looking Back – Leon Russell
 Louisiana Rock & Roll - Potliquor
 Louisiana Woman, Mississippi Man - Conway Twitty and Loretta Lynn
 Love Is the Message – MFSB
 Lucy & Carly – The Simon Sisters Sing for Children – The Simon Sisters
 Main Street People - Four Tops
 Marlena Shaw Live at Montreux - Marlena Shaw (Live Album)
 Mëkanïk Dëstruktïẁ Kömmandöh – Magma
 MFSB – MFSB
 The MG's - The MG's
 Mr. Jones – Elvin Jones
 Monk in Tokyo – Thelonious Monk
 Moon Germs - Joe Farrell
 Moonshine - Bert Jansch
 Multiple - Joe Henderson
 Natural High - Bloodstone
 Neu! 2 – Neu!
 The New Quartet - Gary Burton
 Newport Jazz Festival: Live at Carnegie Hall – Ella Fitzgerald 
 Next – The Sensational Alex Harvey Band
 Nothing Ever Hurt Me (Half as Bad as Losing You) - George Jones
 October - Claire Hamill
 One Man Band - Ronnie Dyson
 Oooh So Good 'n Blues – Taj Mahal
 Our Lady of Late – Meredith Monk
 Outside the Dream Syndicate - Tony Conrad and Faust
 Over the Rainbow - Livingston Taylor
 Palepoli – Osanna
 Penny Arcade - Joe Farrell
 Pipedream – Alan Hull (solo début)
 Plain and Simple – The Dubliners
 Planxty – Planxty (début)
 The Power of Joe Simon - Joe Simon
 Pretty Much Your Standard Ranch Stash – Mike Nesmith
 Really – J.J. Cale
 Right Now! – Little Richard
 Rock On – David Essex
 Rockin' Duck – Grimms
 Sings in Italian for You – Dalida
 Solitaire – Andy Williams
 Solo Concerts: Bremen/Lausanne – Keith Jarrett
 Songs That Made America Famous – Patrick Sky
 Starring Rosi – Ash Ra Tempel
 Studio One Presents Burning Spear - Burning Spear
 Super Natural – Edwin Birdsong
 The Supremes Live! In Japan – Supremes – Live
 The Táin – Horslips
 Tango – Tanguito
 The Three Degrees – The Three Degrees
 Take Love Easy – Ella Fitzgerald and Joe Pass
 Twice Removed from Yesterday – Robin Trower
 Upsetters 14 Dub Blackboard Jungle – Lee Perry
 Viva Chile! – Inti-Illimani
 The Way – The Way
 The Well Below the Valley – Planxty
 Wizzard Brew – Wizzard (début)

Biggest hit singles
The following songs achieved the highest chart positions
in the charts of 1973.

Top 40 Chart hit singles

Other Chart hit singles

Notable singles

Other Notable singles
"Ashes to Ashes" - The 5th Dimension 
"Daddy" b/w "It Was Written Down" - Toots and the Maytals

Published popular music
 "And I Love You So" w.m. Don McLean
 "Candle in the Wind" w. Bernie Taupin m. Elton John
 "Empty Tables" w. Johnny Mercer m. Jimmy Van Heusen.  Introduced by Frank Sinatra
 "I'll Have to Say I Love You in a Song" w.m. Jim Croce
 "I've Got to Use My Imagination"      w.m. Gerry Goffin & Barry Goldberg
 "Last Song" w.m. Lawrence Wayne Evoy
 "Liaisons" w.m. Stephen Sondheim from the musical A Little Night Music "Midnight Train to Georgia"     w.m. Jim Weatherly
 "Misdemeanor" w.m. Foster Sylvers
 "Nadia's Theme" m. Barry DeVorzon and Perry Botkin, Jr., from the TV soap opera The Young and the Restless "(Say Has Anybody Seen) My Sweet Gypsy Rose"     w.m. Irwin Levine & L. Russell Brown
 "Piano Man" w.m. Billy Joel
 "Send in the Clowns"     w.m. Stephen Sondheim from the musical A Little Night Music "Stuck in the Middle with You"     w.m. Joe Egan & Gerry Rafferty
 "There Used To Be A Ballpark" w.m. Joe Raposo
 "Top of the World" w.m. John Bettis & Richard Carpenter
 "The Way We Were" w. Alan and Marilyn Bergman m. Marvin Hamlisch from the film The Way We Were "WOLD (song)" – Harry Chapin
 "Yesterday Once More" w.m. John Bettis & Richard Carpenter

Other notable songs (world)
 "Desert Of Passion" – The Peanuts (Japan)
 "Fusil Contra Fusil" – Silvio Rodríguez (Cuba)
 "Goodbye, My Love, Goodbye" – Demis Roussos (Europe-wide)
 "I Love You Because" – Michel Polnareff (France)
 "J'ai un probleme" – Sylvie Vartan (France)
 "Mistero" – Gigliola Cinquetti (Italy)

Classical music
 Jean Absil – Concerto for Piano and Orchestra No. 3
 William Alwyn – Fantasy Sonata for flute and harp
 Malcolm Arnold – Symphony No. 7
 Günter Bialas – Trois Moments Musicaux, for piano
 Luciano Berio
 Concerto for Two Pianos and Orchestra
 Still, for orchestra
 Linea for Two Pianos, Marimba and Vibraphone
 John CageEtcetera, for small orchestra, tape and, optionally, three conductorsExercise, for an orchestra of soloists (based on Etcetera)
 Carlos ChávezEstudio a Rubinstein, for pianoPaisajes mexicanos, for orchestra
Partita, for timpaniSonante, for orchestra
 Gloria Coates – Music on Open Strings (Symphony No. 1)
 George Crumb – Makrokosmos, Volume II for amplified piano
 Morton Feldman
 String Quartet and Orchestra For Frank O'Hara, for flute, clarinet, percussion, piano, violin, and cello
 Voices and Cello, for 2 female voices and cello
 Alberto Ginastera – String Quartet No. 3
 Lou Harrison – Organ Concerto with Percussion Anthony Iannaccone – Rituals Ben Johnston
"I'm Goin' Away", for SATB choir
String Quartet No. 3, "Vergings"
String Quartet No. 4, "Ascent" ("Amazing Grace")
 Paul Lansky – Mild und leise (computer music)
 Bruno Maderna – Oboe Concerto No. 3
 Frank Martin – Requiem
 Donald Martino – Notturno, for piccolo/flute/alto flute, clarinet/bass clarinet, violin, viola, 'cello, piano, and percussion (awarded the 1974 Pulitzer Prize in Music)
 Akira Miyoshi – Nocturne
 Luigi Nono – Canto per il Vietnam Carl Orff – De temporum fine comoedia Arvo Pärt – Ukuaru valss Walter Piston – Three Counterpoints, for violin, viola, and cello
 Henri Pousseur – Vue sur les Jardins interdits, for saxophone quartet
 Dmitri Shostakovich – Six Poems of Marina Tsvetaeva, Op. 143
 Eduard Tubin – Symphony No. 10

Opera
 Robert Beadell – Napoleon (2 February, University of Nebraska, Lincoln)
 Nikolai Korndorf – Feast in the Time of PlagueJazz

Musical theater
 Gigi (Alan Jay Lerner and Frederick Loewe) – Broadway production (adaptation of the film version)
 Grease – London production
 Gypsy (Jule Styne and Stephen Sondheim) – London production opened at the Piccadilly Theatre on May 29 starring Angela Lansbury, Barrie Ingham and Zan Charisse
 Irene – Broadway revival
 The King and I (Rodgers & Hammerstein) – London revival
 A Little Night Music (Stephen Sondheim) – Broadway production opened at the Shubert Theatre and ran for 601 performances
 No, No, Nanette (Irving Caesar, Otto Harbach, Vincent Youmans) – London revival
 The Pajama Game (Richard Adler and Jerry Ross) – Broadway revival
 Pippin – London production
 Raisin – Broadway production opened at the 46th Street Theatre and ran for 847 performances
 The Rocky Horror Show (Richard O'Brien) – London production
 Seesaw – Broadway production opened at the Uris Theatre on March 18 and ran for 296 performances
 Treasure Island  London production opened at the Mermaid Theatre on December 17.  Starred Bernard Miles, Jonathan Scott Taylor and Spike Milligan.
 Two Gentleman of Verona – London production

Musical films
 Allá en el Norte Andrea Dnestrovskiye melodii Charlotte's Web Godspell Jaal Jesus Christ Superstar Lost Horizon Maria d'Oro und Bello Blue Robin Hood Tom SawyerBirths
January 1 – Magnus Sahlgren, Swedish guitarist and linguist 
January 7 – Jonna Tervomaa, Finnish singer
January 9 – Sean Paul, reggae and dancehall artist
January 12
 Hande Yener, Turkish singer
 Matt Wong (Reel Big Fish)
January 13 - Juan Diego Flórez, Peruvian operatic tenor
January 14 – Katie Griffin, Canadian actress and singer
January 19 – Antero Manninen, Finnish cellist
February 2 - Latino, Brazilian singer-songwriter
February 21 
 Heri Joensen, Faroese musician (Týr)
 Justin Sane, singer, guitarist and songwriter
February 22
Gustavo Assis-Brasil, Brazilian guitarist
Scott Phillips, drummer
February 24 – Chris Fehn, American rock percussionist (Slipknot)
February 26 
 André Tanneberger, German DJ
 Anders and Jonas Björler, Swedish rock guitarists
February 27 – Peter Andre, English-born Australian singer, songwriter, businessman, and television personality 
March 1 – Ryan Peake, Canadian rock musician (Nickelback)
March 6 – Peter Lindgren, Swedish musician
March 10 – Dan Swanö, Swedish musician
March 13 – David Draiman, American vocalist (Disturbed (band))
March 17 – Caroline Corr, Irish drummer (The Corrs)
March 25 – Anders Fridén, Swedish vocalist
March 28 – Matt Nathanson, American folk/rock singer-songwriter
March 30 – DJ AM, American DJ (d. 2009)
April 3 
 Marija Gluvakov, pianist
 Andreas Carlsson, Swedish music producer, composer, and pop songwriter.
April 4 – Kelly Price, soul singer
April 5 – Pharrell Williams, American rapper, singer, songwriter, record producer, and film producer. (The Neptunes, N.E.R.D, Chad Hugo) 
April 16 – Akon, American singer, songwriter, businessman, record producer, and actor
April 25 – Fredrik Larzon, Swedish rock musician (Millencolin)
April 27 – Sharlee D'Angelo, Swedish guitarist
April 29 – Mike Hogan, Irish bassist (The Cranberries)
April 30 – Jeff Timmons, American singer
May 2 – Justin Burnett, film score composer
May 3 – Brad Martin, American country musician (died 2022)
May 5 – Casino Versus Japan, electronic musician
May 13 - Eric Lewis, jazz pianist
May 14
Natalie Appleton, British singer (All Saints)
Shanice, American singer
May 17 – Joshua Homme, guitarist and vocalist of Queens of the Stone Age
May 21 – Noel Fielding, English comedian, writer, actor, artist, musician, and television presenter.
May 23
 Jacopo Gianninoto, Italian musician
 Emperor Magus Caligula, Swedish musician
May 26 - Magdalena Kožená, Czech mezzo-soprano
May 31 – Cadaveria, Italian singer (Opera IX)
June 9 - Jana Sýkorová, Czech operatic contralto
June 10
Faith Evans, singer, songwriter, record producer and actress
Flesh-n-Bone, American rapper
June 13 – Cheryl "Coko" Clemons, American singer (SWV)
June 14 – Ceca, Serbian folk singer
June 17 - Krayzie Bone, American rapper and producer (Bone Thugs-N-Harmony)
June 19 - Jörg Widmann, German clarinetist and composer
June 20 - Chino Moreno, American singer-songwriter (Deftones, Team Sleep, and Crosses)
June 23 – Marija Naumova, Latvian Eurovision-winning singer
June 26 – Gretchen Wilson, American singer
June 28 – Frost, Norwegian drummer
June 29 – Kento Masuda, Japanese composer and recording artist
July 1 – Brenton Brown, South African-American Christian musician and worship leader
July 4 – Gackt, singer, songwriter, and musician
July 5 
 Joe, American R&B singer
 Bengt Lagerberg, Swedish drummer (The Cardigans)
 Róisín Murphy, Irish singer-songwriter and record producer
July 11 – Andrew Bird, singer-songwriter
July 15 
 Buju Banton, reggae/dancehall artist
 John Dolmayan, Lebanese-born rock drummer for the band System of a Down
July 17 – Tony Dovolani, Albanian-American dancer and actor
July 22 
Aleksey Igudesman, Russian violinist, composer, conductor and actor
Daniel Jones, English-Australian guitarist, songwriter, and producer (Savage Garden)
Petey Pablo, American rapper and actor
Rufus Wainwright, American-Canadian singer, songwriter, and composer
July 23 – Fran Healy, British singer (Travis)
July 25 - Dani Filth, Israeli-born musician (Cradle of Filth)
July 29 
 Wanya Morris, American singer (Boyz II Men)
 Amy S. Foster, Canadian singer-songwriter and author 
July 30 – Sonu Nigam, Indian singer
August 7 – Zane Lowe, New Zealand born radio presenter, DJ, TV presenter, and record producer
August 8 – Scott Stapp, American singer (Creed)
August 9 
 Meg Okura, American jazz violinist, Erhu player, and composer
 Oleksandr Ponomariov, Ukrainian singer
August 12 – Grey DeLisle, American voice actress and singer
August 13 - Gregory Vajda, Hungarian clarinetist, conductor and composer
August 15 – Adnan Sami, British born singer, music composer, pianist
August 22
Beenie Man, reggae/dancehall artist
Howie Dorough, American singer (Backstreet Boys)
September 1 – J.D. Fortune, Canadian rock singer (INXS)
September 3 – Jennifer Paige, American singer and songwriter
September 5 – Rose McGowan, American actress, model, singer, and author
September 12 - Dorota Miśkiewicz, Polish singer, songwriter, composer and violinist
September 14 – Nas, American rapper
September 15 – Indira Levak, Croatian lead vocalist of Colonia
September 17 - Amy Black, operatic mezzo-soprano (died 2009)
September 18 – Ami Onuki, Japanese singer
September 19 – David Zepeda, Mexican actor, model and singer
September 22
Yoo Chae-yeong, South Korean singer and actress
Martin Owen (BBC Symphony Orchestra)
September 26 – Julienne Davis, American actress/model/singer
September 29 
Alfie Boe, operatic tenor
Rie Eto, Japanese singer
October 1 – Christian Borle, American actor and singer
October 2
Proof American Rapper and member of D12 (died 2006)
Lene Nystrøm, Norwegian singer (Aqua)
Verka Serduchka, Ukrainian pop star
October 9 
 Terry Balsamo, American guitarist
 Steve Burns, American actor, musician and television host
 Jen Cloher, Australian singer/songwriter/musician 
 Fabio Lione, Italian singer 
October  24 – Laura Veirs, American singer-songwriter
October 25 – Lamont Bentley, American actor and rapper (died 2005)
October 26 – Seth MacFarlane, American actor, screenwriter, producer, director and singer
November 3
Sticky Fingaz, American rapper (onyx)
Mick Thomson, guitarist of Slipknot
November 6 – Rumi Shishido, Japanese voice actress and singer
November 9 
 Nick Lachey, American singer (98 Degrees)
 Maija Vilkkumaa, Finnish pop rock singer
November 10 
 Jacqui Abbott, English singer (The Beautiful South)
 Róbert Gulya, Hungarian composer
November 11 – Jason White, American rock musician (Green Day)
November 12 – Mayte Garcia, American actress, singer, author, and dancer 
November 19 
 Billy Currington, American country singer
 Savion Glover, American tap dancer, actor and choreographer 
November 27 – Twista,American rapper and record producer
November 28 – Jade Puget (AFI)
December 4 – Kate Rusby, English folk singer-songwriter
December 7 
 Chantelle Barry,  Australian singer-songwriter and actress
 Damien Rice, Irish singer-songwriter, musician and record producer
December 8 – Corey Taylor, vocalist of Slipknot
December 9 - Bárbara Padilla, operatic soprano
December 11 – Mos Def, rapper
December 17 - Eddie Fisher (OneRepublic)
December 27 – Kristoffer Zegers, Dutch composer
December 29 – Pimp C, American rapper (d. 2007)unknown date – Xian Zhang. Chinese-born orchestral conductor

Deaths
 January 16 – Clara Ward, gospel singer, 48 (stroke)
 January 23 – Kid Ory, jazz trombonist and bandleader, 86
 February 3 – Andy Razaf, composer, poet and lyricist, 77
 February 5 – Kathleen Riddick, British conductor, 65
 February 7 – Pixinguinha, choro composer and woodwind player, 75
 February 19  
 Joseph Szigeti, violinist, 80
 Leon Washington, jazz saxophonist, 63 (leukemia)
 February 24 – Manolo Caracol, Spanish flamenco singer (b. 1909)
 February 28 – Terig Tucci, Argentine composer, violinist, pianist and mandolinist, 75
 March 5 – Michael Jeffery, Jimi Hendrix's personal manager, 39 (air crash)
 March 8 – Ron Pigpen McKernan, musician and songwriter (Grateful Dead), 27 (stomach hemorrhage)
 March 19 – Lauritz Melchior, Wagnerian tenor, 82
 March 26
 Safford Cape, American composer and musicologist, 66
 Noël Coward, composer and dramatist, 73
 March 28 – Gertrude Johnson, coloratura soprano, 78
 April 16
 Nino Bravo, Spanish singer, 28 (car accident)
 Istvan Kertesz, Hungarian conductor, 43 (drowned)
 April 18 – Willie 'The Lion' Smith, US jazz pianist, 79
 May 9 
 Owen Brannigan, singer
 Mark Wessel, pianist and composer, 79
 May 21 – Vaughn Monroe, US singer and bandleader, 61
 May 27 – Ilona Kabos, Hungarian-British pianist and teacher, 79
 May 29 – P. Ramlee, Malaysian film actor, director, singer, songwriter, composer, and producer, 44 (heart attack)
 June 4 – Murry Wilson, musician and record producer, 55
 June 8 – Tubby Hayes, jazz musician, 38 (during heart surgery)
 June 29 – Germán Valdés, Mexican actor, singer and comedian (hepatitis)
 July 2 – Betty Grable, US actress and singer, 56 (lung cancer)
 July 3 – Karel Ančerl, conductor, 65
 July 6 – Otto Klemperer, conductor, 88
 July 11 – Alexander Mosolov, Russian composer, 72
 July 15 – Clarence White, guitarist (The Byrds), 29 (road accident)
 August 2 – Rosetta Pampanini, operatic soprano, 76
 August 4 – Eddie Condon, jazz banjoist and guitarist, 67
 August 6 – Memphis Minnie, blues singer and guitarist, 76
 August 16 – Astra Desmond, operatic contralto, 80
 August 17
 Jean Barraqué, French classical composer, 45
 Paul Williams, baritone singer and co-founder of the Motown group, The Temptations, 34 (suicide by gunshot)
 August 19 – Brew Moore, jazz saxophonist, 49 (fell downstairs)
 September 1 – Graziella Pareto, operatic soprano, 84
 September 6 – Sir William Henry Harris, organist and composer, 90
 September 10 – Allan Gray, composer, 71
 September 11 – Martha Angelici, operatic soprano, 66
 September 16 – Víctor Jara, Chilean folk singer, 40 (murdered)
 September 17– Hugo Winterhalter, US conductor and arranger, 53
 September 19 – Gram Parsons, guitarist/vocalist, 26 (drug overdose)
 September 20
 Jim Croce, 30, singer-songwriter and
 Maury Muehleisen, 24, multi-instrumentalist and songwriter (plane crash)
 Ben Webster, jazz saxophonist, 64
 October 9 – Sister Rosetta Tharpe, gospel singer, 58
 October 16
 Gene Krupa, drummer, 64
 Jorge Peña Hen, composer, 45
 October 22 – Pablo Casals, cellist, 95
 October 27 – Norman Allin, English singer, 88
 November 10
 Zeke Zettner (The Stooges), 25 (heroin overdose)
 David "Stringbean" Akeman, country banjo player and comedian, 57 (murdered)
 November 18 – Alois Hába, composer, 80
 November 23 – De De Pierce, jazz trumpeter, 69
 November 26 – Edith Mason, operatic soprano, 81
 November 27 – Frank Christian, jazz trumpeter, 85
 December 13 – Fanny Heldy, operatic soprano, 85
 December 20 – Bobby Darin, American singer and actor, 37 (heart failure)
 December 31 – Emile Christian, jazz trombonist, 78
 date unknown – Cäwdät Fäyzi, Tatar composer and folklorist

Awards

Grammy Awards
 Grammy Awards of 1973

Country Music Association Awards
Entertainer of the Year: Roy Clark
Male Vocalist of the Year: Charlie Rich
Female Vocalist of the Year: Loretta Lynn
Song of the Year: Kenny O'Dell – "Behind Closed Doors" 
Album of the Year: Behind Closed Doors''

Eurovision Song Contest
 Eurovision Song Contest 1973

References

 
20th century in music
Music by year